Drew Hutchison can refer to:
Drew Hutchison (baseball), American baseball player
Drew Hutchison (rugby league), Australian rugby league player